Marta Aponte Alsina (22 November 1945 Cayey, Puerto Rico) is a storyteller, novelist and literary critic.

Life
Her parents were Ismael Aponte Meléndez and Ana María Alsina Díaz. She studied Comparative Literature at the University of Puerto Rico, Río Piedras Campus. In 1971, she obtained a degree in Regional Planning at the University of California-Los Angeles (UCLA). In 1979, she studied at the University of New York (NYU), where she obtained a degree in Latin American Literature.

She was the Executive Director of two publishing houses in her country: the  Institute of Puerto Rican Culture Press, and the University of Puerto Rico Press. In addition to writing, she continues to work as an editor and translator.

She is a member of the board of directors of the Latin American Writers Network (RELAT), an organization founded in 1998, based in Lima, Peru, and affiliated with the Women's World Organization for Rights, Literature and Development.

Awards 
 2008. National Novel Prize, 2007. PEN Club de Puerto Rico. for: Sexto sueño.
 2000. Prize of the Institute of Puerto Rican Literature, 1999. for: La casa de la loca y otros relatos.
 1971. Magazine Award. for: "Notas para un estudio ideológico de las novelas de Manuel Zeno Gandía".

Works

Novels 
 2018. PR 3: Aguirre. (Hybrid historical novel, includes interviews.) Cayey, Puerto Rico: Editorial Sopa de Letras. 
 2015. La muerte feliz de William Carlos Williams.  Cayey, Puerto Rico: Sopa de Letras. 
 2012. Sobre mi cadáver. San Juan: La secta de los perros. 
 2010. El fantasma de las cosas. San Juan: Terranova Editores. , 
 2007. Sexto sueño. Madrid: Editorial Veintisiete Letras.
 2004. Vampiresas. Caracas: Ediciones Alfaguara.
 1996. El Cuarto Rey Mago. Editorial Sopa de Letras.
 1994. Angélica furiosa. Editorial Sopa de Letras.

Stories 
 2005. Fúgate (relatos). Editorial Sopa de Letras.
 2001. La casa de la loca y otros relatos. Mexico: Ediciones Alfaguara.
 1999. La casa de la loca (relatos). Editorial Sopa de Letras.

References

External links
 
 

1945 births
Living people
New York University alumni
People from Cayey, Puerto Rico
Puerto Rican short story writers
Puerto Rican women writers
Puerto Rican novelists
University of California, Los Angeles alumni